Ambulyx celebensis is a species of moth in the family Sphingidae. It was described by Karl Jordan in 1919, and is known from Indonesia.

Subspecies
Ambulyx celebensis celebensis (Sulawesi)
Ambulyx celebensis banggaiensis Brechlin & Kitching, 2010 (Sula)

References

Ambulyx
Moths described in 1919
Moths of Indonesia